Mottled moray may refer to three species of eels:

 Echidna delicatula, or the fine-speckled moray
 Gymnothorax prionodon, or the Australian mottled moray
 Gymnothorax undulatus, or the undulated moray